South Australia has an outstanding and rich history of achievements by its sportswomen at the national and international level. This page links to the profiles of these often forgotten and unrecognised sports stars. 
This list includes both those born in South Australia and those who represented South Australia at Olympic, Paralympic, Commonwealth Games and the international level or who represented South Australia at the national level. Journalists and sports administrators who have made a significant contribution to development, promotion and advancement of women's sport in South Australia are also included in this list.

A 

Jen Adams - lacrosse
Frances Adcock - swimming, Olympian
Rosemary Adey - softball, sports administration
Rachel Aistrope - fencing
Dianne Alagich - football (soccer)
Kate Allen - hockey, Olympian
Natalie Avellino - netball

B 

Carmel Bakurski - hockey, Olympian
Suzanne Banks - shooting, Olympian
Kate Barclay - canoe sprinter, Olympian
Louise Bawden - volleyball, Olympian
Valerie Beddoe - diving
Miranda Bennett - rowing
Abby Bishop - basketball
Sharon Black - football (soccer), Olympian
Wendy Blunsden - cricket
Carol Boots - diving
Jenny Borlase - netball
Nicole Boukaram - diving
Grace Bowman - equestrian, Paralympian
Joanne Broadbent - cricket
Michelle Brogan - basketball, Olympian
Rachel Bugg - diving, Olympian
Christine Burton - netball, Umpiring
Dianne Burge - athletics, Olympian
Verna Burnard - athletics, Olympian
Alayna Burns - cycling, Olympian

C 

Vicki Cardwell - squash
Mabel Cashmore - hockey
Barbara Caspers - shooting, Paralympian
Andrea Chaplin - fencing, Olympian
Hayley Chapman - shooting, Olympian
Renee Chatterton - rowing, Olympian
Jenny Cheesman - basketball, Olympian
May Cho - table tennis
Leanne Choo - badminton, Olympian
Coralie Churchett - basketball, Paralympian
Carolyn Cochrane - canoe polo, lacrosse
Jane Crafter - golf
Amanda Cross - rowing

D 

Bea Daly - volleyball, Olympian
Sue Dansie - volleyball, athletics, cricket
Alison Davies - rowing, Olympian
Hannah Davis - canoeing, Olympian
Michelle den Dekker - netball
Helen Denman - swimming, Olympian
Tanya Denver (née Lewis) - journalist
Linda Douglas - gymnastics, Olympian
Jacqueline Dunn - gymnastics
Tamie Durdin - golf

E 

Lauren Ebsary - cricket
Sophie Edington - swimming, Olympian
Annette Edmondson - cycling, Olympian
Lorraine Eiler - basketball, netball, squash, tennis
Holly Evans - hockey
Wendy Ey - athletics

F 

Kate Fairweather - archery, Olympian
Elaine Farmer - surf life saving, sports administration
Kate Farrow - athletics
Alison Feast - shooting, Olympian
Annette Fellows - cricket
Michelle Ferris - cycling, Olympian
Lynda Folauhola - diving, Olympian
Angela Foley - AFLW
Selina Follas - softball, Olympian
Dawn Fraser - swimming, Olympian
Lyn 'Lefty' Fullston - cricket, netball

G 

Karen Gardiner (née Kah) - speed skating, Olympian
Emma George - athletics
Laura Giaretto - basketball, cricket, rugby
Margaret Gibson - swimming, Olympian
Amy Gillett - cycling, rowing, Olympian
June Goodhand - lawn bowls
Tania Gooley-Humphry - volleyball, Olympian
Tammy Gough - table tennis
Donna Gould - cycling, athletics, Olympian
Robyn Grey-Gardner - rowing, Olympian
Tatiana Grigorieva - athletics, Olympian

H 

Amber Halliday - rowing, cycling, Olympian
Rachel Hampton - hockey, Indigenous sportswoman
Juliet Haslam - hockey, Olympian
Kathryn Harby-Williams - netball, sports commentator
Rayoni Head - badminton, Olympian
Audrey Hefford - lawn bowls
Yvonne Hill - shooting, Olympian
Sue Hobbs - wheelchair basketball, Paralympian
Alexandra Hodge - netball
Laura Hodges - basketball, Olympian
Sue Hooley (née Aish) - netball, softball
Lee-Anne Hunter - cricket

I 

Lynley Ingerson (née Hamilton) - cricket, netball

J 

Marjorie Jackson-Nelson - athletics, Olympian
Jana Jamnicky - handball, Olympian
Joan Jones - badminton
Megan Jones - equestrian, Olympian
Marg Jude - cricket, hockey
Tunde Juhasz - cricket

K 

Shirley Kelly - lawn bowls
Jill Kennare - cricket, lacrosse
Jeanette Kieboom
Gail Kingston - lacrosse
Carmen Klomp - rowing, Olympian
Anne-Marie Knight - golf
Libby Kosmala - shooting, Paralympian
Brooke Krueger-Billett - athletics, Olympian

L 

Dot Laughton - cricket, hockey
Jenny Laurendet - athletics
Tiffany Lee - Australian football
Lyn Lillecrapp - swimming, Paralympian
Marie Little - disability sport, sports administration

M 

Vicky Machen - powerlifting, Paralympian
Yvonne Majoor - swimming
Pauline Manser - indoor and beach volleyball, Olympian
Lisa Martin - athletics, Olympian
Anna Maycock - volleyball
Renae Maycock - volleyball, Olympian
Andrea McCauley - cricket
Kay McFarlane - basketball, Olympian
Anna McVann - swimming, Olympian
Anna Meares - cycling, Olympian
Patricia Mickan - basketball, netball, Olympian
May Mills OBE - sports administration pioneer, advocacy, education
Kerry Modra - cycling, Paralympian
Tania Modra - cycling, Paralympian
Marina Moffa - basketball, Olympian
Alicia Molik - tennis, Olympian
Melissa Morgan - swimming, Olympian
Simmone Morrow - softball, Olympian
Stephanie Morton - cycling, Paralympian
Tracey Mosley - softball, Olympian
Belinda Muehlberg - shooting
Sylvia Muehlberg - shooting, Olympian

N 

Stephanie Na - golf
Joy Nancy-Twining - badminton
Jill Need - cricket
Hannah Nielsen - lacrosse
Sally Newmarch - rowing, Olympian
Shelley Nitschke - cricket
Denise Norton - swimming, SA's first Olympian
Glynis Nunn - athletics, Olympian
Julie Nykiel - netball, basketball, Olympian

O 

Wendy Old - athletics
Barbara Orchard - cricket
Mary Ormsby - lawn bowls
Anna Ozolins - rowing, Olympian

P 

Deborah Palmer - swimming, Olympian
Becchara Palmer - volleyball, Olympian
Sarnya Parker - cycling, Paralympian
Katy Parrish - athletics, Paralympian
Anna Pazera - athletics, Olympian
Alison Peek - hockey, Olympian
Erin Phillips - basketball, Olympian
Mary Pickett - lacrosse
Wendy Piltz - lacrosse, cricket, PDHPE teacher-education, author
Sandra Pisani - hockey, Olympian
Hilda Ponchon - lawn bowls
Kerri Pottharst - volleyball, Olympian
Eileen Pritchard - hockey

Q 

Lois Quarrell - journalist
Carolyn Quigley - shooting, Olympian

R 

Marg Ralston - journalist, editor, sports advisor
Alexis Rhodes - Olympian
Leonie Roberts - equestrian
Shelley Rogers - swimming, Paralympian
Gillian Rolton - equestrian, Olympian
Karen Rolton - cricket
Isabella Rositano - canoe sprint, AFL Women's
Julie Russell - athletics, basketball, powerlifting, Paralympian
Sarah Ryan - swimming, Olympian

S 

Kathy Sambell - athletics, Olympian
Rebecca Sanders - netball
Wendy Schaeffer - equestrian, Olympian
Betty Schenke - lawn bowls
Jennifer Screen - basketball, Olympian
Ann Shanley - athletics
Joy Shiels - netball
Sharon Slann - basketball, Paralympian
Kate Slatter - rowing, Olympian
Kerina Smallhorn - hockey, Indigenous sportswoman
Lisa-Anne Smith - shooting, Olympian
Caroline South - swimming
Justine Sowry - hockey
Rachael Sporn - basketball, Olympian
Peta Squire - netball
Jan Stirling - basketball coach, Olympian
Rebecca Stoeckel - swimming
Vanessa Stokes - softball, Indigenous sportswoman
Marina Sulicich - gymnastics, Olympian
Sue Summers - cricket
Laura Summerton - basketball, Olympian
Sarah Sutter - netball

T 

Claire Tallent - athletics, Olympian
Erica Taylor - equestrian, Olympian
Kylie Taylor - lacrosse
Evelyn Tazewell - hockey, cricket
Mary Teasdale-Smith - hockey, equestrian
Susan Tegg - canoeing, Olympian
Faith Thomas - cricket, hockey, Indigenous sportswoman
Norma Thrower - athletics, Olympian
Melissa Trafela - powerlifting, Paralympian
Jessica Trengove - athletics, Olympian
Leanne Trimboli - football (soccer), Olympian
Suzanne Twelftree - tennis, powerlifting, Paralympian

U

V 

Tania Van Heer-Murphy - netball, athletics
Natalie von Bertouch - netball

W 

Desiree Wakefield Baynes - shooting, Olympian
Sue Watkins - hockey, Olympian
Katrina Webb - athletics, Paralympian
Dorothy Wheeler - lawn bowls
Alex Wilson - basketball, Indigenous sportswoman
Kate Wilson-Smith - badminton, Olympian
Jenny Williams - lacrosse, cricket, soccer, touch
Val Winter - shooting, Olympian
Barbara Worley - disability sport, sports administration
Arrienne Wynen - lawn bowls

X

Y 

Song Yang - badminton

Z

References

South